Breathless is the second and final studio album by British metal band The Eyes of a Traitor. It was released in Europe via Listenable Records on 12 July 2010 and in North America on 27 July. The album name is from the title track "Breathless" which was a single 9 months prior to the release of this record. Breathless was released in North America on 8 February via Entertainment 1.

Release and promotion
The track "Nothing to Offer" was released as a digital, non-album single on 1 September 2009 which has been re-recorded for Breathless, as well with the title track Breathless was released as a demo version on their myspace on February 8. On the BBC Radio 1 The Rock Show 11 May 2010 show, Daniel. P.Carter played Come to my Senses, the proposed first single for this album. they have continued to promote the album by releasing the 6th track 'Talk of the town' on their Myspace on 10 June. the band commented that "the song is probably the heaviest tune on the new album. It was one of the first songs we've created for 'Breathless' and it was written in a day."
The album was leaked on 11 July.

Track listing

Personnel
The Eyes Of a Traitor
 Jack Delany - lead vocals
 Matthew Pugh - guitars
 Tim George - guitars
 Jack Moulsdale - bass, co-lead vocals
 Sam Brennan - drums, guitars, bass, backing vocals
Production
Produced & mixed by John Mitchell
Engineered by Ben Humphreys & James Bilinge
Management by Leander Gloversmith
Publicity by Emma Van Duyts (Public City PR)
Booking by Marco Walzel
Artwork by Paul Jackson (Tank.Axe.Love)
Photo by Alex Gregory

References

2010 albums
The Eyes of a Traitor albums
Albums produced by Ed Sokolowski